Ohio Township may refer to:

 List of townships in Ohio

Illinois
 Ohio Township, Bureau County, Illinois

Indiana
 Ohio Township, Bartholomew County, Indiana
 Ohio Township, Crawford County, Indiana
 Ohio Township, Spencer County, Indiana
 Ohio Township, Warrick County, Indiana

Iowa
 Ohio Township, Madison County, Iowa

Kansas
 Ohio Township, Franklin County, Kansas
 Ohio Township, Ness County, Kansas, in Ness County, Kansas
 Ohio Township, Saline County, Kansas
 Ohio Township, Sedgwick County, Kansas
 Ohio Township, Stafford County, Kansas, in Stafford County, Kansas

Missouri
 Ohio Township, Mississippi County, Missouri

Ohio
 Ohio Township, Clermont County, Ohio
 Ohio Township, Gallia County, Ohio
 Ohio Township, Monroe County, Ohio

Pennsylvania
 Ohio Township, Pennsylvania

South Dakota
 Ohio Township, Hand County, South Dakota, in Hand County, South Dakota

Township name disambiguation pages